Soukchinda Natphasouk (born 30 October 1995) is a Laotian professional footballer who currently plays as a midfielder for Champasak F.C in the Lao League 1. season 2022 He scored two goals at the 2015 Southeast Asian Games.

International career

International goals
Scores and results list Laos's goal tally first.

References

External links
 

1995 births
Living people
Laotian footballers
Laos international footballers
Association football midfielders
Footballers at the 2018 Asian Games
Asian Games competitors for Laos